Warren Randall Morris (born January 11, 1974) is an American former college and Major League Baseball player. He is most remembered for his two-out, 9th inning walk-off home run that won the 1996 College World Series for the Louisiana State University Tigers.

Early life
Morris grew up in Alexandria, Louisiana and graduated from Bolton High School. He played baseball, basketball and cross country at Bolton High.

College career
He did not receive an athletic scholarship to play baseball, but made the team while on academic scholarship as a second baseman. He did not play at second base in his first season at LSU, because the Tigers already had All-American Todd Walker at the position. Morris did see action at other positions. His best season at LSU came in 1995. He  hit .369 with 8 home runs, 50 RBI, and 18 stolen bases.

LSU was expecting big things from Morris in 1996, but a broken hamate bone kept him out of the lineup for 42 games that season. He did rejoin the team in time for the 1996 postseason, which would include the College World Series. However, the wrist injury still lingered. He could not hit for power, and was placed at the bottom of the lineup.

College World Series hero
LSU reached the championship game of the College World Series in 1996, and was trailing Miami 8–7 in the game with two outs in the bottom of the ninth inning. Morris came up to the plate with one runner on base, and hit Miami relief pitcher Robbie Morrison's first pitch just inches over the right field fence. The walk-off home run won the game for the Tigers 9–8. It was his only home run of the season, and is the only walk-off championship-winning home run in College World Series history. In addition, it is the only 2-out, ninth inning, walk-off home run in a championship of any collegiate or professional level. The home run also won Morris the 1997 Showstopper of the Year ESPY Award.

Major League Baseball career
Morris was drafted in the fifth round of the 1996 Major League Baseball Draft by the Texas Rangers as a second baseman. He started out in the Rangers' farm system, but was later traded to the Pittsburgh Pirates along with relief pitcher Todd Van Poppel for starting pitcher Esteban Loaiza. Morris had a promising rookie season with the Pirates, hitting .288 with 15 home runs and 73 RBI, while placing third in National League Rookie of the Year voting. He also made the 1999 Topps All-Star Rookie Roster at second base. It was his best season as a pro. However, the Pirates released him before the  season. Morris was the starting second baseman for the  Detroit Tigers, following the release of Damion Easley. For the rest of his career, he was a journeyman infielder in the minor leagues.

See also
1996 LSU Tigers baseball team

References

External links

1974 births
Living people
Akron Aeros players
American expatriate baseball players in Canada
Baseball players at the 1996 Summer Olympics
Baseball players from Louisiana
Edmonton Trappers players
Carolina Mudcats players
Charlotte Rangers players
Detroit Tigers players
LSU Tigers baseball players
Major League Baseball second basemen
Medalists at the 1996 Summer Olympics
Memphis Redbirds players
Minnesota Twins players
Nashville Sounds players
Oklahoma City 89ers players
Olympic bronze medalists for the United States in baseball
Pawtucket Red Sox players
Pittsburgh Pirates players
Sportspeople from Alexandria, Louisiana
Toledo Mud Hens players
Tulsa Drillers players